The 2012 Latvian Women's League was the ninth edition of the premier women's football championship in Latvia. It was contested by five teams, and it ran from May 1 to November 25, 2012. Liepājas Metalurgs won its second title with a two points advantage over Rīgas FS.

Teams

Table

Results

Top scorers

References

2012
Women Football League
Latvian Women's League